Cupriavidus taiwanensis is a Gram-negative, nitrogen-fixing bacterium of the genus Cupriavidus and family Burkholderiaceae, which forms indeterminate nodules on Mimosa pudica. The genome of C. taiwanensis is completely sequenced.

See also
 List of sequenced bacterial genomes

References

External links
Type strain of Cupriavidus taiwanensis at BacDive -  the Bacterial Diversity Metadatabase

Burkholderiaceae
Bacteria described in 2004